Multivision or Multivisión may mean any of the following:

Multivisión (Cuba), Cuba's fifth national television channel
Multivision (Sri Lanka), a pay TV provider in Sri Lanka
Multivision Plus (Indonesia), a movie production house in Indonesia
Multivision (television technology), a late 1980s technology that enabled picture-in-picture display on older TVs
MVS Multivisión, a cable provider in Mexico now known as MASTV